Robert Randolph Ellis (born December 15, 1970) is a former starting pitcher who played in Major League Baseball between  and . He batted and threw right-handed.

Career
Listed at 6' 5", 220 lb., Ellis was selected by the Chicago White Sox in the 1990 Major League Baseball draft out of the Northwestern State University of Louisiana. From –, he pitched at five different minor league levels. Ellis began his pro baseball career in the minors with the New York–Penn League's Utica Blue Sox in 1991. In , Ellis once again played for two different teams playing for the Single-A Sarasota White Sox of the Florida State League. And later for the Double-A Birmingham Barons of the Southern League. On July 27, 1996, Ellis was traded to the California Angels for Pat Borders.

Ellis reached the majors in 1996 with the Angels, spending one year with them before moving to the Arizona Diamondbacks, Los Angeles Dodgers and Texas Rangers. His most productive season came in 2001 with Arizona, when he set career-highs in wins (6), strikeouts (41) and innings pitched (92.0). 
 
In a four-season career, Ellis posted a 7–7 record with 54 strikeouts and a 6.03 ERA in 118.0 innings.

After that, Ellis pitched in the International League for the Cleveland and Philadelphia organizations.

On February 4, Ellis was named the Gulf Coast Mets pitching coach.

Beginning in late 2009, Ellis was the strength and conditioning and head baseball coach at Henderson High School in Henderson, Texas.

In August 2012, Ellis became Assistant Athletic Director and head baseball coach at Central Heights High School in Nacogdoches, Texas.

In early 2021, Ellis starting coaching at Bullard High School in Bullard, Texas, where he is the head baseball coach and teaches Outdoor Education and Physical Education.

Personal life
Ellis is a family friend and mentor of pitcher Philip Humber.

References

External links
, or Retrosheet
The Baseball Gauge
Mexican League
Venezuela Winter League

1970 births
Living people
Águilas Cibaeñas players
American expatriate baseball players in the Dominican Republic
American expatriate baseball players in Canada
American expatriate baseball players in Mexico
Arizona Diamondbacks players
Baseball coaches from Louisiana
Baseball players from Baton Rouge, Louisiana
Birmingham Barons players
Buffalo Bisons (minor league) players
California Angels players
Gulf Coast White Sox players
Las Vegas 51s players
Leones del Caracas players
American expatriate baseball players in Venezuela
Los Angeles Dodgers players
Louisville Redbirds players
Major League Baseball pitchers
Mexican League baseball pitchers
Minor league baseball coaches
Nashville Sounds players
New Orleans Zephyrs players
Northwestern State Demons baseball players
Northwestern State University alumni
Oklahoma RedHawks players
Panola Ponies baseball players
Sarasota White Sox players
Scranton/Wilkes-Barre Red Barons players
Sportspeople from Baton Rouge, Louisiana
South Bend White Sox players
Sultanes de Monterrey players
Syracuse Chiefs players
Texas Rangers players
Tucson Sidewinders players
Utica Blue Sox players
Vancouver Canadians players